The Mediterranean Allied Air Forces (MAAF) was the major Allied air force command organization in the Mediterranean theater from mid-December 1943 until the end of the Second World War.

Formation

The Mediterranean Allied Air Forces (MAAF) became the official Allied air force command organization in the Mediterranean theatre after the previous Mediterranean Air Command (MAC) was disbanded on December 10, 1943. Initially, Air Chief Marshal Sir Arthur Tedder who had commanded MAC, was retained as Air Commander-in-Chief of MAAF but in mid-January 1944, Lieutenant General Ira Eaker took over command of MAAF when Dwight D. Eisenhower chose Tedder as his Deputy Supreme Allied Commander to plan the air operations for the Normandy Landings.  In March 1945, Lieutenant General John K. Cannon assumed command of MAAF.

Organization of the MAAF
In keeping with the previous Allied convention established at the Casablanca Conference of naming commanders from one air force [United States Army Air Force (USAAF) or Royal Air Force (RAF)] and their deputies from the other air force, Eaker's Deputy Air Commander-in-Chief of MAAF became Air Marshal Sir John Slessor on January 20, 1944. Slessor, who also was named Commander-in-Chief of RAF Mediterranean and Middle East (previously AHQ Malta, a major sub-command of the disbanded MAC), had been the commander of RAF Coastal Command which was taken over by Air Chief Marshal Sir Sholto Douglas, the previous commander of RAF Middle East Command, another major sub-command of the disbanded MAC.

MAAF reinstated the original RAF tri-force model (see No. 205 Group, No. 201 Group, and Air Headquarters Western Desert) that was used to create the Northwest African Air Forces, the largest and major sub-command of the disbanded MAC. Thus, MAAF retained a long-range "strategic" bomber force, a "coastal" anti-shipping force, and a "tactical" close air support force. 
Accordingly, the three major combat commands of MAAF were:
Mediterranean Allied Strategic Air Force (MASAF) under Major General Nathan Twining
Mediterranean Allied Coastal Air Force (MACAF) under Air Vice-Marshal Hugh Lloyd
Mediterranean Allied Tactical Air Force (MATAF) under Major General John K. Cannon.

The MAAF tri-force replaced the previous NAAF tri-force:
Northwest African Strategic Air Force (NASAF) under Major General James Doolittle
Northwest African Coastal Air Force (NACAF) under Air Vice-Marshal Hugh Lloyd
Northwest African Tactical Air Force (NATAF) under Air Vice-Marshal Sir Arthur Coningham.

Air Vice-Marshal Hugh Lloyd was commander of NACAF and he stayed on as commander of MACAF. Doolittle of NASAF who temporarily commanded the new 15th Air Force before going to England to command the 8th Air Force, was replaced by Twining for the new MASAF. Coningham of NATAF who assumed command of Second Tactical Air Force, was replaced by Cannon of the new MATAF. Cannon also commanded the 12th Air Force which under the new MAAF organization was much more recognizable than it had been under the previous MAC/NAAF organization. When the 12th Air Force transferred all of its heavy bomb groups and its B-26 Marauder medium bomb groups to the 15th Air Force, the 12th became strictly a tactical air force and the 15th became a strategic air force (November 1, 1943). Twining commanded both MASAF and the 15th Air Force just as Cannon commanded both MATAF and the 12th Air Force.  This helped to provide the unified command structure that was a major goal of the reorganization.

Lieutenant General Carl Spaatz, the previous NAAF, 12th Air Force, and 8th Air Force commander, took over the new United States Strategic Air Forces (USSTAF) consisting of Doolittle's 8th Air Force and Twining's 15th Air Force. This allowed Spaatz to borrow the 15th in Italy for long-range strategic bombing of European targets when inclement weather in England prevented the 8th from flying missions. Under this scenario, some heavy bombers took off from Italy, bombed German targets, and landed in England. Similarly, some flew the opposite route. Overnight stops in Russia were also made by some of the long-range bombers of the 8th and 15th Air Forces.

AVM John Whitford replaced Lloyd in November 1944. Sir Guy Garrod replaced Slessor in early 1945.

Effectiveness
With the defeat of Germany and the end of World War II in Europe, Headquarters, MAAF, Intelligence Section (United States) saw an opportunity to learn first-hand how effective the Allied air war was from the enemy's perspective. A series of interviews with high-ranking German officers resulted in the July 1945 compilation of the MAAF Air Surrender Documents.

General Heinrich von Vietinghoff, who at various times commanded German Tenth Army or Army Group C and was the Commander in Italy at the end of the war, was particularly impressed by the effectiveness of the Allied fighter-bombers:
"The ceaseless use of fighter-bombers succeeded in paralyzing all day-time movement..."
"The fighter-bomber pilots had a genuinely damaging effect."
"Even the tanks could move only at night because of the employment of fighter-bombers."
"The effectiveness of the fighter-bombers lay in that their presence alone over the battlefield paralyzed every movement."

Regarding air attacks on railroads, General von Vietinghoff stated the following:

"Rail traffic was struck in the most protracted fashion by the destruction of bridges. Restoration of bridges required much time; the larger bridges could not be repaired. As improvisation, many bridge sites were detoured or the supplies were reloaded. With the increasing intensity of the air attacks, especially on the stretch of the Brenner, the damaged sections were so great and so numerous that this stretch, despite the best of repair organization and the employment of the most powerful rebuilding effort, became ever worse and was only ever locally and temporarily usable. A few bad weather days, in which the Allied Air Force could not have flown, would often have sufficed to bring the traffic again to its peak. Only in February and March (1945) was it again possible to travel by rail through the Brenner to Bologna."

When asked if Allied air power was chiefly responsible for Germany's defeat in this war, each of the German officers below gave his own answer:

Colonel General Heinrich von Vietinghoff, Supreme Commander Southwest, "Yes..."
General Karl Wolff, SS Obergruppenfuehrer and General of the Waffen SS, "Yes..."
General Joachim Lemelsen, Commanding General 14th Army, "Considered as a part of the general material superiority of the Allies, the strength of the Allied Air Force was of first importance - especially during the last year in Italy..."
General Kurt Jahn, Commanding General of Lombardy Command, "They were of great, but not decisive importance."
Major General von Schellwitz, Commanding General 305th Division, "Yes..."
Lt. General Boehlke, Commanding General 334th Division, "The Allied Air Forces have played large part in the defeat of Germany..."

Dissolution
With the end of the war in Europe the MAAF was dissolved. The RAF components reformed as new British commands. MACAF became the RAF's Mediterranean Coastal Air Force and then AHQ Italy. The MASAF was disbanded in August 1945; the MATAF in July 1945.

See also

 List of Royal Air Force commands

Notes
Notes

References
Citations

Bibliography

 Craven, Wesley F. and James L. Cate. The Army Air Forces in World War II, Volume 2, Chicago, Illinois: Chicago University Press, 1949 (Reprinted 1983).
Ehlers Jr., Robert S. The Mediterranean Air War: Airpower and Allied Victory in World War II (University Press of Kansas, 2015) xvi, 520 pp. 
 Howe, George F., Northwest Africa: Seizing the Initiative in the West, Center of Military History, Washington, DC., 1991.
 Maurer, Maurer. Air Force Combat Units Of World War II. Maxwell Air Force Base, Alabama: Office of Air Force History, 1983. .
 Richards, D. and H. Saunders, The Royal Air Force 1939-1945 (Volumes 2-3, HMSO, 1953).
 Rust, Kenn C. Twelfth Air Force Story...in World War II. Temple City, California: Historical Aviation Album, 1975 (republishished in 1992 by Sunshine House of Terre Haute, Indiana). .
 Mediterranean Allied Air Forces, Air Surrender Documents, prepared by H.Q. MAAF, Intelligence Section (U.S.), 1945.

Allied air commands of World War II